This article lists the Canadian number-one albums of 1974. The chart was compiled and published by RPM every Saturday.

The top position (December 29, 1973, Vol. 20, No. 20) preceding January 12, 1974 (Vol. 20, No. 21-22) was Jim Croce's Life and Times. Three acts  held the top position in the albums and singles charts simultaneously: Love Unlimited on March 2, Gordon Lightfoot on June 22 – 29 and Elton John on August 10. As well, Marvin Hamlisch's "The Entertainer" taken from The Sting topped the chart on May 25 as the soundtrack to the film topped the album charts .

(Entries with dates marked thus* are not presently on record at Library and Archives Canada and were inferred from the following week's listing. There was no publication on May 4. The preceding chart for April 27 (Vol. 21, No. 11) is chronologically followed by the chart for May 11 (Vol. 21, No. 12). September 28's listing presently has the singles and album charts reversed; as well, the album chart is that of August 24. Hence, the reading was inferred from the following week's chart.)

References

See also
1974 in music
RPM number-one hits of 1974

1974
1974 in Canadian music